This is a list of French television related events from 2007.

Events
6 March - Les Fatals Picards are selected to represent France at the 2007 Eurovision Song Contest with their song "L'amour à la française". They are selected to be the fiftieth French Eurovision entry during a national final held at the La Plaine-St-Denis Studios in Paris.
13 June - Julien Doré wins the fifth series of Nouvelle Star.
23 June - The television reality show Secret Story debuts on TF1. This carries on from the previous similar show, Loft Story.
31 August - The first series of Secret Story is won by 23-year-old triplets Marjorie, Cyrielle and Johanna Bluteau.
11 December - 27-year-old breakdancer Junior wins the second series of Incroyable Talent.

Debuts
23 June - Secret Story (2007–present)
24 November Sushi Pack (French Dub)

Television shows

1940s
Le Jour du Seigneur (1949-present)

1950s
Présence protestante (1955-)

1970s
30 millions d'amis (1976-2016)

1990s
Sous le soleil (1996-2008)

2000s
Star Academy (2001-2008, 2012-2013)
Nouvelle Star (2003-2010, 2012–present)
Plus belle la vie (2004–present)
Incroyable Talent (2006–present)

Ending this year
5, Rue Sésame (2005-2007)

Births

Deaths

Jacques Martin

See also
2007 in France

References